The Minister for Infrastructure is a ministerial post created in November 2008 by the Government of New Zealand, in accordance with the National party's pre-election policy.

Conception
National leader Don Brash announced his intention to create the office on 18 August 2005 in the campaign for the 2005 New Zealand general election. He cited the rewriting of the Resource Management Act 1991–which he described as a "major impediment" to fast decisions– as a major task for the future minister, who would also work with ministers in the areas of transport, energy, communications, building and the environment. The creation of the portfolio was one of the National Party's election pledges for the 2005 general election.

History
The Minister of Infrastructure post was tipped by some media for Steven Joyce but was given to Bill English, who held the position for the first term of the Fifth National Government of New Zealand, and was sworn in on 19 November 2008. Joyce was appointed Associate Minister. The portfolio was absorbed into the Minister of Finance portfolio on 14 December 2011  as Key formed his Cabinet after the 2011 New Zealand general election.

The position was re-created on 20 December 2016, when Prime Minister Bill English named his Cabinet on 18 December 2016. Steven Joyce was named to the post, as well as Minister of Finance.

List of Ministers 
Key

References 
 Infrastructure Briefing for the Incoming Minister, 2008

Infrastructure
Infrastructure
Political office-holders in New Zealand